George Grunert (July 21, 1881 – January 12, 1971) was a United States Army cavalry officer who worked his way up through the ranks from private to retirement as a lieutenant general. His 47-year career extended from the Spanish–American War to the end of World War II.

Education and early career
George Grunert was born in White Haven, Pennsylvania, on July 21, 1881, a son of David Grunert and Henrietta (Hollmann) Grunert. He graduated from White Haven High School in 1898 and joined the United States Army for the Spanish–American War. Enlisting as a private in the 2nd Artillery Regiment, he performed coast artillery duties in the Philippines, Cuba and on the west coast of the United States. He advanced through the ranks to corporal, sergeant, and quartermaster sergeant, and was serving at Fort Monroe in Virginia, when his application for a commission was approved. Grunert was commissioned as a second lieutenant of Cavalry in February 1901. He accepted in April and was assigned to the 11th Cavalry Regiment. By 1908 he was stationed in Cuba and in 1910 he was assigned to Fort Oglethorpe, Georgia.

World War I and the inter-war years
Grunert was sent to France as an observer with British forces in 1917 during World War I. During the American build up, he served as assistant chief of staff for I Corps and was awarded the Army Distinguished Service Medal for his work during the United States offensives of 1918. The citation for the medal reads:

In 1919, Grunert attended the Army War College then at Washington Barracks, now Fort Lesley J. McNair, in Washington, D.C. He served with the 1st Infantry Division at Camp Dix, then to Washington, D.C., to serve in the office of the Army Chief of Staff. He returned to the field as a lieutenant colonel of the 10th Cavalry Regiment at Fort Huachuca in Arizona in 1925.

After a second tour of duty in the office of the Army Chief of Staff, Grunert attended the Command and General Staff School at Fort Leavenworth in Kansas from 1930 to 1932. In 1933, he was the director of military intelligence and espionage division course at the Army War College and in 1935, he became director of war plans division course.

In 1936, Grunert was posted to the Philippines as commanding officer of the 26th Cavalry Regiment (Philippine Scouts). He received his promotion to brigadier general in December 1936 in preparation for his command of the 23rd Brigade, a brigade of the Philippine Division composed of Philippine Scouts.

In November 1938 Grunert succeeded George C. Marshall in command of 5th Brigade at Vancouver Barracks, Washington. Grunert was promoted to major general in 1939 and, in October, returned to the Philippines to command the Philippine Division. From May 1940 to November 1941 Grunert commanded the Philippine Department, directing the United States Army supervision and control over the Philippine defense force until Douglas MacArthur came out of retirement to assume command in July 1941. MacArthur abolished the Philippine Department as a redundant command echelon in November 1941 and Grunert returned to the United States.

World War II
The Japanese attack on Pearl Harbor occurred shortly after Grunert reached the United States, and he was shuffled between a number of assignments that included command of the Sixth Service Command at Fort Sheridan, Illinois, serving as the ranking military officer in the Chicago area, and two administrative posts with Army Service Forces as Deputy Chief of Staff for Service Commands (Service of Supply) overseeing the nine United States-based supply and logistics commands (formerly corps areas), under General Brehon B. Somervell.

In August 1943, Grunert was appointed deputy commander for both the Eastern Defense Command, a continental defense command for the eastern United States, and First United States Army at Fort Jay, Governors Island in New York City, taking the place of General Hugh A. Drum upon his mandatory retirement at age 64 in October 1943 and being promoted to lieutenant general at the same time.

Grunert held interim command over First Army until January 1944 while Lieutenant General Omar N. Bradley completed assembling and staffing its new headquarters in England for the Normandy Invasion. Grunert continued command of Eastern Defense Command, which also assumed the duties of Central Defense Command, and Second Service Command for the New York area until his retirement in July 1945.

Pearl Harbor investigation
In June 1944, Grunert was appointed by Secretary of War Henry Stimson as the presiding officer of a secret panel that investigated the army response to events prior to the attack on Pearl Harbor. The Pearl Harbor Board report, released after the war, traced the entire military and diplomatic history prior to the attack finding much fault along the way, critical of break downs in communications between Secretary of State Cordell Hull, George C. Marshall and a failure of appropriate action by Hawaiian Department commander, Walter C. Short. The panel's method of investigation and conclusions are still subject to criticism today.

Retirement
Grunert died at Brooke Army Hospital in San Antonio, Texas, on January 12, 1971, at age 89 and was buried at Fort Sam Houston National Cemetery. He was survived by his wife Florence Reynolds, daughter Mary and son-in-law, then First United States Army commander, Lieutenant General Jonathan O. Seaman at Fort Meade, Maryland. His son, Colonel George R. Grunert, attended the United States Military Academy, graduating with the class of 1930 and played on the army polo team. He was a veteran of World War II and Korea and preceded his father in death.

Decorations
Ribbon bar with the list of General George Grunert's decorations:

Dates of rank

Citations

References
 
 
 Biography of Sofia Adamson, Civilian, War Department, Fort Santiago, Philippines

External links
Generals of World War II

United States Army Cavalry Branch personnel
American military personnel of the Spanish–American War
United States Army personnel of World War I
United States Army generals of World War II
United States Army generals
1881 births
1971 deaths
United States Army Command and General Staff College alumni
United States Army War College alumni
Military personnel from Pennsylvania
Burials at Fort Sam Houston National Cemetery